The 1985 Canadian federal budget for fiscal year 1985-1986 was presented by Minister of Finance Michael Wilson in the House of Commons of Canada on 23 May 1985. This is the first federal budget under the premiership of Brian Mulroney.

External links 

 Budget Speech
 Budget Papers
 Budget in Brief

References

Canadian budgets
Federal budget
Canadian Federal budget
Federal budget
Federal budget